Welvis Dias Marcelino, better known as Vivinho (March 10, 1961 – September 13, 2015), was an association football striker, who played in several Brazilian Série A clubs.

History
Born in Uberlândia, Vivinho started playing professionally in 1983, defending local club Uberlândia. He played 26 Série A games and scored five goals between 1983 and 1986, winning the Série B in 1984. Vivinho joined Vasco in 1986, playing 54 Série A games and scoring 13 goals. Before leaving Vasco in 1990, he won the Campeonato Carioca in 1987 and in 1988, and the Série A in 1989. Vivinho then joined Vasco's rivals Botafogo, leaving the club in 1993, after having played 52 Série A games and scored four goals. He played 10 Série A games for Goiás in 1993, scoring four goals, then he returned to Uberlândia in 1994, retiring in 1995 after defending Fortaleza.

National team
Vivinho played three games for the Brazilian national team in 1989. The first game was played on March 15, against Ecuador. He scored his only goal for Brazil on April 12, against Paraguay, in his last game for the country.

Death

Vivinho died on 13 September after passing out in his home, he was taken to hospital but did not survive. The cause of death has not been revealed.

References

1961 births
2015 deaths
Sportspeople from Minas Gerais
Brazilian footballers
Brazil international footballers
Uberlândia Esporte Clube players
CR Vasco da Gama players
Botafogo de Futebol e Regatas players
Goiás Esporte Clube players
Fortaleza Esporte Clube players
Association football forwards